Mahidol Adulyadej Naval Dockyard (Thai: อู่ราชนาวีมหิดลอดุลยเดช กรมอู่ทหารเรือ) is a Royal Thai Navy shipyard in Sattahip, Chonburi. It is named after Prince Mahidol Adulyadej, who served in the Royal Siamese Navy from 1912 through 1914. There are plans to base one of Thailand's submarines at the dockyard.

Operations 
 HTMS Krabi (commissioned 2013) is an offshore patrol vessel built at the dockyard. It is a modified river-class patrol vessel.
 The Chinese-made HTMS Bangpakong was refitted at the yard and re-entered service in early-2017.
HTMS Prachuap Khiri Khan (2017) is the second Krabi class offshore patrol vessel built at the dockyard.

References

Shipyards of Thailand
Royal Thai Navy